Ivar Tveit (18 September 1880 – 1952) was a Norwegian newspaper editor.

He hailed from Hyllestad. He edited the newspaper Velgeren from 1907 to 1925, then from 1927 Sogns Avis in Vikøyri. In 1932 he started the newspaper Sogn in Leikanger, renamed Sogn og Fjordane in 1936. He edited the newspaper until 1947, except for a period during the occupation of Norway by Nazi Germany when he had to flee to Sweden. The newspaper belonged to the Agrarian Party.

Tveit was also a member of the Defence Commission of 1920.

References

1880 births
1952 deaths
People from Sogn og Fjordane
People from Hyllestad
Norwegian newspaper editors
Norwegian expatriates in Sweden